5 Rifles is a 1974 Hindi film produced and directed by I. S. Johar. The film stars Rajesh Khanna's look-alike Rakesh Khanna, Shashi Kapoor's look-alike Shahi Kapoor, and I. S. Johar. Music was given by Kalyanji Anandji. One particular qawwali of note in this film is the track "Jhoom Barabar Jhoom Sharabi", sung by the notable qawwal singer of his times, Janab Aziz Nazan. Another song "Jab se Sarkar ne Nashabandi Tod Di", sung by Kishore Kumar is also a hit semi-qawwali.

Cast
 Prafull Mishra (a Rajesh Khanna look-alike) as Rakesh Khanna
 Shahi Kapoor (a Shashi Kapoor look-alike) as Dacoit Raka
Ambika Johar as Rajkumari/Khatari
I. S. Johar as Harfan Mama
Kamal Kapoor as Police Commissioner
Veena as Maharani
Murad as Wajid Saab
D.K. Sapru as Maharaja (as Sapru)
Keshto Mukherjee as Drunkard (as Keshto Mukerji)
Ram Avtar as Constable (fatso)
Anil Johar as Captain Aslam
Satyadeep
Anu (as Master Anu)
Ketty Irani

Songs
"Jhum Baraabar Jhum Sharaabi" - Aziz Nazan
"Duniya Ke Banane Wale Ne" - Kishore Kumar
"Teraa Husn Allah Allah Teraa Rup Ram Ram" - Kishore Kumar
"Jab Se Sarakar Ne Nashabandee Tod Dee" - Kishore Kumar
"Malmal Me Badan Mora Chamke" - Asha Bhosle
"Pyar Ke Patang Ki Dor Jiske Hath Hai" - Kishore Kumar

References

External links 
 

1974 films
Indian drama films
Films scored by Kalyanji Anandji
1970s Hindi-language films
1974 drama films